This is a '''list of online and AM/FM Jakarta radio stations, Indonesia, and their frequencies.

Call letter is shown to distinguish some radio stations from their regional counterparts (for example Radio Elshinta in Jakarta and Bandung). Indonesia uses call letter for FM radio stations.

FM (MHz)

Jakarta Special Region

Jakarta Metropolitan Area
These radio stations serve satellite cities of Jabodetabek; they may have their broadcasts received in only parts of Jakarta. The frequencies of the stations have been deliberately designed not to overlap with radio stations at Jakarta.

AM (kHz)

  603 NHK Radio 1
  666 Broadcast Indonesia Network 1 (Radio nam-nam) 
776 Music Radio Jakarta Barat A Part Of Fact Group Gaya
  720 Radio Silaturrahim (Rasil)
  756 Radio Rodja (Transmitter is in Bogor, West Java)
  792 Broadcast Indonesia Network 2 (TBS Radio)
  828 Radio Berita Klasik
  999  RRI (National Radio) Pro-3 (Transmitter moved to Bandung, West Java)
 1026 Suara Khatulistiwa
 693 http://www.radiomuara.com Radio Muara Jakarta Download in playstore or appstore 
 1062 Radio Cendrawasih
 1134 Radio Safari
 1098 Radio UNTAR - Universitas Tarumanagara (VOMS)(www.radiountar.com)
 1224 Radio SDK Sang Timur Jakarta
 1332 RRI (National Radio) Pro-4 (INACTIVE)
 1494 Broadcast Indonesia Network 3 (Radio Angkatan Bersenjata (Radio Suara Jakarta))

References 

Radio stations
Jakarta